Haider Ali (born 12 December 1984 in Gujranwala) is an all-around Pakistani para-athlete who created history at the 2008 Summer Paralympics in Beijing, China by winning Pakistan's first ever Paralympic games medal, a silver. He also shared a new world record with his jump of 6.44 meters at the Games. He has competed at the Paralympics on four occasions in 2008, 2012, 2016 and 2020. He has the unique record of winning a country's first ever Paralympic gold, silver and bronze medals as he is the only Pakistani to have won a medal in Paralympic history. On 3 September 2021, he became the first gold medalist for Pakistan at the Paralympics.

2008 Summer Paralympics
Haider, who has cerebral palsy, took part in F-37/38 Category men's long jump and covered a distance of 6.44 meters, winning a silver medal at the 2008 Summer Paralympics. A Tunisian athlete, Farhat Chida, who covered the same distance, won a gold medal because he made six successful jumps overall, whereas Haider's second and fifth jumps were rejected but he managed to equal Chida in his last attempt. Haider's medal achievement was Pakistan's first Paralympic medal and was also Pakistan's first silver medal at the Paralympics.

Both Haider and Farhat Chida scored a total of 1104 points each through their 6.44 meter jump, which is also a new world record in the games for people with disabilities.

In addition to T-38 Category, Haider also participated in three other events. In the 100 meter T38 sprint he was ranked ninth among nine runners, in the 200 meters against 7 runners he came in fifth and in the Discus Throw F37/38, where he was close to winning a bronze medal but his points tally of 986 fell just seven short of Dong Xia of China, who compiled 1003 points and took third place.

2010 Asian Para Games
Ali won two medals at the 2010 Asian Para Games held in Guangzhou, China. Ali won gold in F 38 Long jump event and a bronze in the T-38 100m.

2016 Summer Paralympics 
He claimed his second Paralympic medal of his career when he claimed a bronze in T37 long jump event at the 2016 Summer Paralympics. It was also Pakistan's first ever bronze medal at the Paralympics. He was also the flag bearer for Pakistan during the opening ceremony of the Rio Paralympics.

2020 Summer Paralympics
On 3 September 2021, Haider Ali won first-ever gold medal for Pakistan in Paralympics history with a throw of 55.26 metres in discus throw to win F37 event at the 2020 Summer Paralympics.

Career
Previously, Haider Ali has won a gold medal for Pakistan in the long jump event at the KL’06 FESPIC Games held in Kuala Lumpur, Malaysia, in November–December 2006.

References

External links
Overall Medal Standings on Official Beijing 2008 Paralympic Games Website 

1984 births
Living people
Athletes from Punjab, Pakistan
Sportspeople from Gujranwala
Pakistani male long jumpers
Pakistani disabled sportspeople
Paralympic athletes of Pakistan
Paralympic gold medalists for Pakistan
Paralympic silver medalists for Pakistan
Athletes (track and field) at the 2008 Summer Paralympics
Athletes (track and field) at the 2012 Summer Paralympics
Athletes (track and field) at the 2020 Summer Paralympics
Medalists at the 2008 Summer Paralympics
Medalists at the 2016 Summer Paralympics
Medalists at the 2020 Summer Paralympics
Paralympic medalists in athletics (track and field)
Sportspeople with cerebral palsy
Athletes (track and field) at the 2016 Summer Paralympics
Paralympic bronze medalists for Pakistan
Medalists at the 2010 Asian Para Games
Medalists at the 2018 Asian Para Games